This is a partial list of famous Croatian sportspeople.

Individual sports

Alpine skiing
 Nika Fleiss - Alpine skier,
 Ana Jelušić - Alpine skier,
 Janica Kostelić - Alpine Skier World Cup Champion in 2001, 2003 & 2006 - (Four Olympic Gold & Two Silver Medals)
 Ivica Kostelić - Alpine skier, Olympic Silver Medalist in 2006 & 2010.
 Danko Marinelli - Alpine skier,
 Sofija Novoselić - Alpine skier,
 Ivan Ratkić - Alpine skier,
 Dalibor Šamšal - Alpine skier,
 Antony Sumich

Boxing
 Stjepan Božić - WBF Super Middleweight Champion
 George Chuvalo - Fmr. Canadian Heavyweight Champion
 Stipe Drviš - World Light Heavyweight Boxing Champion
 Željko Mavrović - Fmr. European Boxing Champion
 Bob Mirović - 8 Times Australian Heavyweight Champion
 Mate Parlov - Fmr. WBC & European Light Heavyweight Champion
 Diana Prazak - professional female boxer from Australia
 Mario Preskar
 Damir Škaro - Olympic silver medal 1988
 Fritzie Živić (The Croat Comet) - Fmr. World Welterweight Champion

Discus throw
Sandra Perković - Olympic Gold Medal 2012

Kayaking
Matija Ljubek

Kickboxing
 Mladen Brestovac - K1 Kickboxer and FFC Heavyweight Champion
 Branko Cikatić - First K-1 Grand Prix Winner
 Igor Jurković - K1 kickboxer
 Stefan Leko - Croatian heritage. German K1 Kickboxer
 Marko Tomasović
 Ivan Stanić

Martial arts
Sandra Šarić - Olympic Bronze Medal 2008
Lucija Zaninović - Olympic Bronze Medal 2012
Martina Zubčić - Olympic Bronze Medal 2008

MMA
 Mirko Filipović (Cro Cop) - Mixed Martial Artist And Kickboxer, PRIDE FC 2006 Open-Weight Grand Prix Champion and last K-1 World Grand Prix Champion
 Zelg Galešić - Mixed Martial Artist
 Pat Miletich (The Croatian Sensation) - Former UFC Champion
 Stipe Miočić - Current UFC Heavyweight Champion
 Igor Pokrajac - UFC Mixed Martial Artist
 Goran Reljić - UFC Mixed Martial Artist

Motorsport
 Robbie Frančević - NZ Touring car race driver
 Gary Gabelich - American automobile-racing driver
 Paul Radisich - NZ Racing car driver (Son of Frank Radisich)
 Auggie Vidovich – NASCAR Driver

Running
 Branko Zorko

Rowing
 Luka Grubor - UK Olympic Gold Medalist (Rowing)
 Damir Martin - Olympic Silver Medalist in 2012 & 2016
 Valent Sinković - Olympic Gold Medalist in 2016, Olympic Silver Medalist in 2012
 Martin Sinković - Olympic Gold Medalist in 2016, Olympic Silver Medalist in 2012

Sailing
Petar Cupać
Šime Fantela
Ivan Kljaković Gašpić
Pavle Kostov
Igor Marenić
Tina Mihelić
Luka Mratović
Enia Ninčević
Tonči Stipanović
Romana Župan

Shooting
Giovanni Cernogoraz - Olympic Gold Medal 2012
Bojan Đurković
Anton Glasnović
Petar Gorša
Snježana Pejčić

Swimming
 Đurđica Bjedov
 Duje Draganja
 Sanja Jovanović
 Mirna Jukić
 Tomislav Karlo
 Gordan Kožulj
 Miloš Milošević
 Kim Daniela Pavlin
 Marko Strahija
 Mario Todorović

Table tennis
 Tamara Boroš
 Zoran Primorac
 Antun Stipančić
 Dragutin Šurbek
 Tian Yuan

Tennis
 Mario Ančić
 Marin Čilić
 Borna Ćorić
 Ivan Dodig
 Željko Franulović
 Sabrina Goleš
 Saša Hiršzon
 Goran Ivanišević
 Boro Jovanović
 Ivo Karlović
 Ivan Ljubičić
 Mirjana Lučić
 Iva Majoli
 Petra Martić
 Josip Palada
 Nikola Pilić
 Goran Prpić
 Franjo Punčec
 Jelena Kostanić Tošić
 Antonio Veić
 Donna Vekić

Triathlon
 Dejan Patrčević

Wrestling
 Victor Jovica
 Josip Peruzović
 Jerry Sags
 Stan Stasiak
 Shawn Stasiak
 Hugo Savinovich
 Nenad Žugaj - Bronze at World Championships 2011
 Neven Žugaj - Bronze at World Championships 2010

Team sports

Football
1998 FIFA World Cup bronze medalists

Current players

Former players

American football

 Bill Belichick - NFL Coach (grandson of Croatian immigrants)
 Brian Belichick - NFL coach (great-grandson of Croatian immigrants)
 Stephen Belichick - NFL coach (great-grandson of Croatian immigrants)
 Steve Belichick - NFL player & coach (son of Croatian immigrants)
 Brian Billick - NFL Coach
 Tony Butkovich – College football player
 Pete Carroll - NFL Coach (Irish father, Croatian mother)
 David Diehl - NFL player
 Greg Dulcich - NFL player
 Eddie Erdelatz – NFL player
 Elvis Grbac - NFL player
 John Jurkovic - NFL player
 Joe Kuharich - NFL Coach
 Les Horvath – NFL player
 John Jurkovic – NFL player
 Tony Mandarich - NFL player
 Vic Markov – NFL player (son of Croatian immigrants)
 Rob Ninkovich – NFL player (grandson of Croatian immigrants)
 Lou Saban – NFL Coach
 Nick Saban - College football coach
 Cole Cubelic - American college football player and radio host
 Frank Sinkwich - NFL player, 1942 winner of the Heisman Trophy (born in Croatia)
 Paul Skansi – American football player
 Nick Skorich – American football player and coach
 Josef Spudich – American football player
 Joe Stydahar – American football player
 Chris Zorich - NFL player (African-American father, Croatian mother)

Australian rules football
 Adrian Barich - Australian rules footballer and Rugby League player
 Tony Begovich - Australian rules footballer
 Gavin Crosisca - Australian rules footballer
 Alan Didak - Australian rules footballer
 Jon Dorotich - Australian rules footballer
 Marc Dragicevic - Australian rules footballer
 Ray Gabelich - Australian rules footballer
 Darren Gaspar - #1 pick in 1993
 Travis Gaspar - Australian rules footballer
 John Gerovich - Australian rules footballer
 Brent Grgic - Australian rules footballer
 Ilija Grgic - Australian rules footballer
 George Grljusich - Australian rules footballer
 Allen Jakovich - Australian rules footballer
 Glen Jakovich - Australian rules footballer
 Judd Lalich - Australian rules footballer
 Matthew Liptak - Australian rules footballer
 Addam Maric - Australian rules footballer
 Ivan Maric - Australian rules footballer
 Lukas Markovic - Australian rules footballer
 Tony Modra - Australian rules footballer
 Matthew Pavlich - Australian rules footballer
 Val Perovic - Australian rules footballer
 Steven Salopek - Australian rules footballer
 Craig Starcevich - Australian rules footballer
 Nick Suban - Australian rules footballer
 Peter Sumich - Australian rules footballer
 Jacob Surjan - Australian rules footballer
 Andrew Ukovic - Australian rules footballer

Baseball
 Johnny Babich - Baseball player
 Reid Brignac – Baseball player
 Ann Cindric - Baseball player
 Tom Haller – Baseball player
 Ed Jurak - Baseball player
 Al Jurisich – Baseball player
 Mike Kreevich – Baseball player
 Curt Leskanic – Baseball player
 Johnny Logan – Baseball player
 Mickey Lolich - Baseball player
 Steve Lubratich – Baseball player
 Roger Maris - Baseball Legend
 Catfish Metkovich – Baseball player
 Erv Palica (Pavlicevich) - Baseball player
 Johnny Pesky - Baseball player
 Dan Plesac – Baseball player
 Matt Skrmetta - baseball player
 Paul Spoljaric - Baseball player
 Christian Yelich - baseball player
 Bob Zupcic - baseball player

Basketball

 John Abramovic - Fmr. NBA player
 Franjo Arapović - Fmr. NBA Player
 Dalibor Bagarić - Fmr. NBA player
Dragan Bender (born 1997) - player in the Israeli Basketball Premier League
 Bojan Bogdanović - NBA player
 Andrew Bogut - Australian NBA player, drafted 1st overall in 2005 (both parents Croatian)
 Krešimir Ćosić - NBA Hall of Famer
 Zoran Čutura
 Danko Cvjetičanin
 Frank Drmic - Australian basketball player
 Gordan Giriček - NBA player
 Vinko Jelovac - basketball player
 Mario Kasun - NBA player
 Arijan Komazec
 Toni Kukoč - NBA player (NBA Sixth Man of the Year, 1995-1996 season)
 Jack Marin - Fmr. American NBA Star
 Kevin McHale - NBA Hall of Famer (Croatian mother)
 George Mikan - NBA Hall of Famer
 Antonija Mišura
 Dražen Petrović - NBA Hall of Famer
 Zoran Planinić - NBA player
 Gregg Popovich - American Basketball Coach
 Dino Rađa - Fmr. NBA player
 Dario Šarić (Super Dario) – NBA Player with the Phoenix Suns
 Petar Skansi
 Branko Skroče
 Damir Šolman
 Ivan Sunara
 Bruno Šundov - Fmr. NBA player
 Josip Gjergja
 Nikola Plećaš
 Vinko Jelovac
 Željko Jerkov
 Andro Knego
 Duje Krstulović
 Mihovil Nakić
 Aleksandar "Aco" Petrović
 Velimir Perasović
 Mirko Novosel
 Žan Tabak - Fmr. NBA player
 Rudy Tomjanovich - Fmr. NBA player and coach, No.2 pick in 1970 NBA Draft
 Andy Tonkovich - 1948 first NBA pick
 Ratomir Tvrdić
 Roko Ukic - Current NBA player, No. 41 pick in 2005 NBA Draft
 Andrew Vlahov - Fmr. Australian NBA player
 Stojan Vranković - Fmr. NBA player
 Nikola Vujčić (born 1978) - basketball player and team manager of Maccabi Tel Aviv
 Ante Žižić (born 1997) - basketball player in the Israeli Basketball Premier League

Cricketers
 Anton Devcich - NZ cricket player
 Simon Katich - Australian cricket player
 Antony Sumich - NZ cricket player - player for Croatia
 Joseph Yovich - NZ cricket player

Handball
 Ivano Balić
 Mirko Bašić
 Patrik Ćavar
 Lino Červar
 Davor Dominiković
 Mirza Džomba
 Valner Franković
 Slavko Goluža
 Bruno Gudelj
 Hrvoje Horvat - Handball Player
 Boris Jarak
 Vladimir Jelčić
 Božidar Jović
 Pavle Jurina
 Nikša Kaleb
 Nenad Kljaić
 Velimir Kljaić
 Ante Kostelić
 Blaženko Lacković
 Venio Losert
 Valter Matošević
 Petar Metličić
 Zoran Mikulić
 Zdravko Miljak
 Alvaro Načinović
 Željko Nimš
 Goran Perkovac
 Miroslav Pribanić
 Iztok Puc
 Zlatko Saračević
 Zvonimir Serdarušić
 Irfan Smajlagić
 Ivan Snoj
 Vlado Šola
 Denis Špoljarić
 Goran Šprem
 Vladimir Šujster
 Renato Sulić
 Albin Vidović
 Igor Vori
 Drago Vuković
 Zdenko Zorko
 Zdravko Zovko
 Vedran Zrnić

Hockey
 Joseph Cattarinich – NHL Hall of Famer
 Jonathan Filewich – ice hockey player
 Mark Fistric – ice hockey player
 Travis Hamonic – ice hockey player
 John Hecimovic – ice hockey player
 Tony Hrkac - Fmr. NHL player
 Dan Kordic - Fmr. NHL player
 John Kordic - Fmr. NHL player
 Frank Mahovlich - NHL Hall of Famer (1958 Calder Trophy Winner)
 Peter Mahovlich - Fmr. NHL player, nr. 2 in 1963 NHL Amateur Draft
 John Mayasich - Fmr. hockey player
 Phil Oreskovic – ice hockey player
 Victor Oreskovich – ice hockey player
 Mark Pavelich - Fmr. NHL player (Miracle on Ice)
 Matt Pavelich - first NHL linesman inducted into the Hockey Hall of Fame
 Marty Pavelich - Fmr. NHL player
 Borna Rendulić - NHL player
 Cory Sarich - Fmr. NHL player
 Joe Sakic - fmr. NHL player
 Buzz Schneider - ice hockey player
 Adrien Plavsic - (Serb father, Croat mother) Fmr. NHL player
 Joel Prpic - Hockey player (brief appearance in the NHL)
 Rob Valicevic - NHL player
 Marc-Édouard Vlasic - NHL player

Rugby
 Anthony Boric -  Rugby Union player
 Frano Botica - Rugby Union player
 Ivan Cleary - Rugby League player and coach
 Matthew Cooper - Rugby Union player
 Bronko Djura - Rugby League player
 Sean Fitzpatrick - Rugby Union player
 Ivan Henjak - Rugby League player
 Matt Henjak - Rugby Union player
 Max Krilich - Rugby league player
 Dan Luger -  Rugby Union player
 Tony Mestrov - Rugby League player
 James Stosic - NZ Rugby League player
 Antony Sumich - Rugby Union player
 Brendon Winslow - Rugby Union player
 Croatia national rugby union team

Volleyball
 Elena Chebukina
 Tomislav Čošković
 Barbara Jelić
 Igor Omrčen
 Nataša Osmokrović
 Marcos Milinkovic - Argentine volleyball player
 Maja Poljak
 Alejandro Spajic - Argentine volleyball player

Waterpolo
 Veljko Bakašun
 Ozren Bonačić - Fmr. water polo player & coach
 Marko Brainović
 Perica Bukić - Water polo player and politician
 Ivo Cipci
 Nikša Dobud - Water polo player
 Tomislav Franjković
 Zdravko Hebel
 Vladimir Ivković
 Zoran Janković (water polo)
 Zdravko Ježić
 Hrvoje Kačić
 Zdravko-Ćiro Kovačić
 Ivo Kurtini
 Ronald Lopatni
 Deni Lušić
 Kristijan Milaković
 Miroslav Poljak
 Lovro Radonjić
 Ivo Štakula
 Karlo Stipanić
 Goran Sukno
 Dubravko Šimenc
 Ivo Trumbić
 Božo Vuletić
 Marijan Žužej

Other sports
 Aida Badić – former artistic gymnast
 Sandra Bezic – figure skater, choreographer and television commentator
 Val Bezic – figure skater
 Fred Couples – Golfer (former World number 1)
 Mirko Filipović - K1, UFC, PRIDE fighter
 Gary Gabelich – American automobile-racing driver
 Sofia Mulanovich - famous Peruvian surfer
 Franjo Mihalic - Marathon athlete
 Frank Nobilo - NZ Golfer
 Abdon Pamich – race walker
 Snježana Pejčić- shooting player
 Sandra Perković – discus thrower
 The Great Antonio - Strongman and Eccentric
 Blanka Vlašić – High jumper
 Luka Perković -  Midlaner, former botlaner and MSI 2019 Champion

See also
List of VFL/AFL players by ethnicity

Croatian sportspeople